Arzu Özyiğit Bildirir (born Arzu Özyiğit; October 16, 1972) is a Turkish female former basketball player. The 1.88 m (6 ft 2 in) international competitor played in the center position. She is currently serving as a general manager of Fenerbahçe.

Özyiğit started basketball in 1984 with Botaş Spor in Adana. After she played with several clubs like İÜSK, Fenerbahçe, Galatasaray, Özyiğit moved to the Greek club Panserraikos in 2002. Özyiğit returned home and played for Fenerbahçe, Kocaeli BB and Beşiktaş.

She was 5-time member of the Turkish girls’ and 190-time member of the Turkish women's national team, a record in the country. Özyiğit won 18 champion title with her clubs. She is the first player in Turkey, who won the championship at four different teams. The latest one with Beşiktaş as the team's captain in 2005. She transferred to Mersin BB team in July 2005.

Özyiğit was also captain of the gold medal-winning team at the 2005 Mediterranean Games in Almería, Spain. She could not play at the final match because of complications with her pregnancy, but the team dedicated the medal to her.

In 2009, she became trainer of the Turkey under-20 women's national basketball team that participated at the 2009 FIBA U20 championships held in Gdynia, Poland. She served in 2010 also as trainer at a basketball school in Kartal, Istanbul. In November 2010, Arzu Özyiğit returned to active sports transferring to Canik Belediyespor, a club in Samsun Province, which plays in the Turkish Women's Basketball Second League (TKB2L).

In June 2003, she married businessman Mustafa Bildirir. He owns an Italian cuisine restaurant "Pulcinella" at Kozyatağı neighborhood in Kadıköy district of Istanbul, where she also helps out whenever she finds time.

See also
 Turkish women in sports

References

1972 births
Sportspeople from Mersin
Living people
Turkish women's basketball players
Fenerbahçe women's basketball players
Beşiktaş women's basketball players
Galatasaray S.K. (women's basketball) players
Kocaeli Büyükşehir Belediyesi Kağıt Spor athletes
Centers (basketball)
20th-century Turkish sportswomen
21st-century Turkish sportswomen